Jack is an unincorporated community in Dent County, in the U.S. state of Missouri.

History
A post office called Jack was established in 1905, and remained in operation until 1954. An early postmaster gave the community the first name of his son, Jack Jadwin.

References

Unincorporated communities in Dent County, Missouri
Unincorporated communities in Missouri